Maravilla is a name that is Spanish for "wonder".  It may refer to:

Persons
Delio "Maravilla" Gamboa Rentería, Colombian footballer  
Lady Maravilla, Mexican luchadora
Luis Maravilla, Spanish composer
Sergio Martínez, Argentinian boxer known as "Maravilla"

Places
Cerro Maravilla, Puerto Rican mountain
Maravilla Tenejapa, a city in Chiapas, Mexico
The original name of East Los Angeles, California
Maravilla (LACMTA station), a Los Angeles Metro Rail station in East L.A.

Titles of art and literature
Pais Maravilla, album by Magos Herrera
 Maravilla (film), 1957 Spanish language comedy/musical
La Maravilla, novel by Alfredo Vea, Jr. 
La Maravilla, a 2008 album by Arcángel (singer)

See also
Maravilla Tenejapa, a town
Maravillas (disambiguation)
Maravilha (disambiguation)